The Flemish Horse, is a Belgian breed of draught horse. It became extinct in the nineteenth century when it was merged with the Brabant to create the Belgian Draught. From about 1993 it was recreated from some stock kept by Amish people in the United States. A breed association, Het Vlaams Paard, was formed in 1999. In 2005 the breed was officially approved by the Flemish government, and the breed association authorised to manage the stud-book.

History 

Flemish horses became famous in Mediaeval times. They were among the gifts sent by Charlemagne to the Abbasid caliph Haroun ar-Rashid in 807.

It is an endangered breed. In 2013 total numbers were about 100 head, with about 35 brood mares and 5 stallions.

Characteristics 

The Vlaams Paard, like several other draught breeds with Belgian Draught ancestry, may be affected by junctional epidermolysis bullosa. Unlike the Belgian Draught, it is not susceptible to chronic progressive lymphoedema.

References 

Horse breeds originating in Belgium